Universe is the twelfth and final studio album by German duo Modern Talking, released on 31 March 2003 by Hansa Records. The album debuted at number two on the German chart on 14 April 2003, spending three weeks within the top 10 and 12 weeks altogether on the chart. Universe has been certified gold by the Bundesverband Musikindustrie (BVMI) for shipping over 100,000 units in Germany.

Track listing

Notes
  signifies a co-producer

Charts

Weekly charts

Year-end charts

Certifications

References

2003 albums
Hansa Records albums
Modern Talking albums